Van Winkle's Mill Site is a historic 19th-century industrial site at 21392 Arkansas Highway 12 near Rogers, Arkansas.  The area, located in the hollow of Little Clifty Creek northeast of the junction of AR 12 with AR 127 (and partly extend across the road to the southwest), includes the foundational remnants of a series of mills operated between 1850 and 1890 by Peter Van Winkle, a major figure in the lumber industry of northwestern Arkansas in the late 19th century.  The site included, in addition to mill buildings, Van Winkle's residence, a blacksmithy, and quarters used by the workers, which included slaves during the period before the American Civil War.   Oral histories pertaining to the site include claims of a cemetery, but excavations conducted between 1997 and 2005 failed to produce evidence of its location.  Van Winkle's first mill and house were burned during the Civil War, and the site was later scavenged for materials after it was abandoned.

The site was listed on the National Register of Historic Places in 2007.

See also
National Register of Historic Places listings in Benton County, Arkansas

References

Archaeological sites on the National Register of Historic Places in Arkansas
Buildings and structures completed in 1850
Buildings and structures in Benton County, Arkansas
National Register of Historic Places in Benton County, Arkansas